Abellaite is a hydrous carbonate mineral discovered in the abandoned Eureka uranium mine in the village of Torre de Capdella (Lleida province), Catalonia, Spain. The ideal chemical formula of abellaite is NaPb2(CO3)2(OH). It is named in honor of Joan Abella i Creus, a Catalan gemmologist who has long studied minerals from the Eureka mine and first found abellaite in the mine.  A team composed, among others, by Jordi Ibáñez-Insa from the Institute of Earth Sciences Jaume Almera (CSIC) and by Joan Viñals and Xavier Llovet from the University of Barcelona, identified and characterized the mineral’s structure and chemical composition.

Abellaite crystals are colorless to white, with a glassy or pearly appearance, and are easily crumbled. The mineral has a known synthetic analogue and is chemically similar to sanrománite. Robert Hazen et al. predicted its existence in 2015.

Localities 
Catalonia, Spain: Eureka mine, Castell-estaó, La Torre de Cabdella, La Vall Fosca, El Pallars Jussà, Lleida, Catalonia

Russia: Yubileinaya pegmatite, Karnasurt Mt, Lovozero Massif, Murmanskaya Oblast', Northern Region

References

External links

Carbonate minerals
Trigonal minerals
Minerals in space group 159